Magnus Svensson may refer to:

 Magnus Svensson (floorball) (born 1983), floorball player
 Magnus Svensson (footballer) (born 1969), football player
 Magnus Svensson (ice hockey b. 1963) (born 1963), ice hockey player
 Magnus Pääjärvi-Svensson (born 1991), ice hockey player

See also

 Svensson